This article is a list of United States presidential candidates. The first U.S. presidential election was held in 1788–1789, followed by the second in 1792. Presidential elections have been held every four years thereafter.

Presidential candidates win the election by winning a majority of the electoral vote. If no candidate wins a majority of the electoral vote, the winner is determined through a contingent election held in the United States House of Representatives; this situation has occurred twice in U.S. history. The procedures governing presidential elections were changed significantly with the ratification of the Twelfth Amendment in 1804. Since 1824, a national popular vote has been tallied for each election, but the national popular vote does not directly affect the winner of the presidential election.

The United States has had a two-party system for much of its history, and the major parties of the two-party system have dominated presidential elections for most of U.S. history. The two current major parties are the Democratic Party and the Republican Party. At various points prior to the American Civil War, the Federalist Party, the Democratic-Republican Party, the National Republican Party, and the Whig Party were major parties. These six parties have nominated candidates in the vast majority of presidential elections, though some presidential elections have deviated from the normal pattern of two major party candidates. In most elections, third party and independent candidates have also sought the presidency, but no such candidates have won the presidency since the ratification of the Twelfth Amendment, and only two such candidates have finished second in either the popular vote or the electoral vote.

Pre-12th Amendment: 1789–1800

Prior to the ratification of the Twelfth Amendment in 1804, each member of the Electoral College cast two votes, with no distinction made between electoral votes for president and electoral votes for vice president. Under these rules, the individual who received the most electoral votes would become president, and the individual who received the second most electoral votes would become vice president.

The following candidates received at least one electoral vote in elections held before the ratification of the Twelfth Amendment in 1804. Winning candidates are bolded. Political parties began to nominate presidential candidates in the 1796 presidential election, and candidates are listed as members of the Democratic-Republican Party (DR) or the Federalist Party (F) for the 1796 and 1800 elections.

Post-12th Amendment: 1804–present

Since the ratification of the Twelfth Amendment in 1804, each member of the Electoral College has cast one vote for president and one vote for vice president, and presidential candidates have generally competed on a ticket with a running mate who seeks to win the vice presidency. Since 1824, the national popular vote has been recorded, though the national popular vote has no direct effect on the winner of the election.

The following candidates won at least 0.1% of the national popular vote in elections held since 1824, or won at least one electoral vote from an elector who was not a faithless elector.

† and bolded indicates a winning candidate
‡ indicates a losing candidate who won a plurality or majority of the popular vote
↑ indicates a third party or independent candidate who finished second in the popular vote or the electoral vote (or both)
§ indicates a pending election that hasn't been fully confirmed

See also 
 Third party and independent candidates for the 2020 United States presidential election
 List of Democratic Party presidential primaries
 List of Republican Party presidential primaries
 List of United States major party presidential tickets
 List of United States major third party and independent presidential tickets
 List of United States presidential candidates by number of votes received
 List of presidential nominating conventions in the United States

Notes

References

Works cited

Further reading